Anisomorpha is a genus of walking stick insect capable of secreting a substance from glands on the metathorax that can cause an intense burning irritation of the eyes and mouth of potential predators on contact. In some cases, this causes temporary blindness. Species are found throughout the mainland Central, northern South America, and the southeastern United States.  The adult female is larger than the male in length and width.  There are currently four accepted species in this genus, and all are wingless.

References

Further reading

External links

Phasmid Study Group: Anisomorpha
Pubs.rsc.org
Pubs.acs.org
Springerlink.com
Pubs.acs.org (2)
Iospress.metapress.com
Anisomorpha buprestoides, twostriped walkingstick on the UF / IFAS  Featured Creatures Web site

Phasmatodea genera
Taxa named by George Robert Gray